Mark Uytterhoeven (born 6 March 1957) is a Belgian television presenter, TV scriptwriter, actor, comedian and former sports journalist.

Uytterhoeven started his career at the Flemish public TV channel BRT (nowadays VRT), where he was a sports journalist. In 1991 he hosted the humorous TV talk show Het Huis van Wantrouwen, alongside Wouter Vandenhaute. The show was a ratings hit and praised for its innovative style. Two years later, Uytterhoeven followed it up with another humorous TV talk show, Morgen Maandag (1993), which he hosted on his own. Because of the overwhelming success, Uytterhoeven decided to focus on hosting humorous shows without much media promotion, like the improvisation show Onvoorziene Omstandigheden (1994-1995) and the sketch series Alles Kan Beter (1997-1995). 

He is also credited with writing the script for the human interest show Man bijt hond in 2001, and was host of the late night talk show  until  took it over from him in 2006.

Uytterhoeven is known for living in France, near the Côte d'Azur.

TV filmography
De Laatste vriend (1993)
Morgen maandag (1993) TV Series .... Gastheer
De Magische steen (1988) .... Swimming teacher
... aka Pierre magique, La (Belgium: French title)
Feest! 50 jaar televisie (2003) (TV) .... Himself
De Laatste show (1999) TV Series .... Host (2002-)
Alles komt terug (2001) TV Series .... Himself
Alles Kan Beter (1998) TV Series .... Himself
Onvoorziene Omstandigheden (1994–1995) TV Series .... Himself
Morgen Maandag (1993) TV Series .... Himself
Het Huis van wantrouwen (1991–1992) TV Series .... Himself
Tien voor taal (1995) TV Series .... Himself
Sportweekend (1960) TV Series .... Presentator

External links
 

Flemish television presenters
Flemish television writers
Flemish male television actors
Belgian television talk show hosts
Belgian sports journalists
Belgian male comedians
1957 births
Living people
20th-century Flemish male actors
People from Mechelen
Male television writers